In mathematics, an Igusa curve is (roughly) a coarse moduli space of elliptic curves in characteristic p with a level p Igusa structure, where an Igusa structure on an elliptic curve E is roughly a point of order p of E(p) generating the kernel of V:E(p) → E.  An Igusa variety is a higher-dimensional analogue of an Igusa curve.

References

Algebraic geometry
Elliptic curves